Kultuk may refer to: 
Kultuk, Slyudyansky District, Irkutsk Oblast, an urban locality in Irkutsk Oblast
Kultuk, Usolsky District, Irkutsk Oblast, a rural locality in Irkutsk Oblast
Dead Kultuk, a bay in the Caspian Sea
Nord-Ost-Kultuk, a village in Azerbaijan
:ru:Култук (ветер), a southwestern wind in the Lake Baikal area